Elvira Gascón Vera (May 17, 1911 – February 10, 2000) was a Spanish painter, drafter, and engraver who participated in the Mexican muralism movement and is known for synthesizing Spanish and Mexican styles. Gascón also illustrated hundreds of books and periodicals, originating the drawing style known as helenismo picassiano.

Life 
Gascón was born in Almenar, Soria. She was accepted into Madrid's Real Academia de Bellas Artes de San Fernando in 1929 and studied there till 1935. She taught in Madrid at the Instituto Lope de Vega and the Escuela de Artes y Oficios. When the Spanish Civil War broke out in 1936, Gascón joined the Junta de Incautación del Tesoro Artístico Nacional, which seized national artistic treasures to keep them safe during the chaotic years of war and destruction. While working for the institute, she met her future husband,  (1891–1966), the institute's president and brother of the architect  (1888–1931). Gascón and Fernández emigrated to exile in Mexico in 1939, following the defeat of the Spanish Republicans by the right-wing Nationalist rebels. In Mexico, Gascón became a prolific and widely known artist, with Mexican artists and intellectuals like Rubén Bonifaz Nuño praising her artistic technique and simplicity of style.

Gascón had two daughters, Guadelupe and Elvira. Elvira, b. 1944 in Mexico City, is a known sculptor.

Later in life, Gascón suffered from Parkinson's disease. She died in Mexico City in 2000 at the age of 88.

Career 
In Mexico, Gascón painted several murals in churches, and participated in 28 single and 45 group exhibitions. She also illustrated magazines and about 150 books.

References 

1911 births
2000 deaths
20th-century engravers
20th-century Spanish painters
Spanish engravers
Spanish illustrators
Spanish women illustrators
Spanish muralists
Spanish women artists
20th-century Spanish women artists
Women muralists
Women engravers
Spanish emigrants to Mexico